The Wichita State Shockers men's basketball team is the NCAA Division I college basketball program representing Wichita State University in Wichita, Kansas.

The Shockers have made 16 appearances in the NCAA tournament, reaching the Final Four twice, the Elite Eight four times, and the Sweet Sixteen six times. The team plays its home games at Charles Koch Arena, where it averaged 10,391 fans per game in 2012, ranking 38th nationally.

The Shockers have made two Final Four appearances, losing both games. They made their first Final Four appearance in 1965 losing to UCLA 89–108. They made their second appearance in 2013, losing to Louisville 68–72.

In 2014, Wichita State defeated the Northern Iowa Panthers in the regular season finale for their 9th Missouri Valley conference regular season title, becoming two-time defending MVC champions. The Shockers completed a perfect, undefeated regular season and swept the conference post-season tournament en route to a #1 seed in the NCAA tournament where they lost to eventual national runner-up Kentucky in the round of 32.

The Shockers competed in the Missouri Valley Conference from 1949–50 to 2016–17 and have competed in the American Athletic Conference since the 2017–18 season.

History

Wichita State, then known as Fairmount College, first took the court in 1906 under head coach Willis Bates. During this time, the sports teams were known as the "Wheatshockers". The first official game was held in the basement of Fairmount Hall. Fairmount lost to Washburn University by a score of 37–10. During this inaugural season, the Wheatshockers only won two games.

Fairmount acquired a permanent home when Memorial Gymnasium was opened on January 15, 1921 in a game against the American Legion of Wichita. The gym was later renamed Henrion Gymnasium in 1926. That same year, the newly renamed Municipal University of Wichita (popularly known as "WU") joined the Central Conference in athletics.

WU gained notice outside of Wichita in 1927 when, led by First-Team All-American Ross McBurney and Second-Team All-American Harold Reynolds, the Wheatshockers finished the 1927 season with a 13–1 record and a second-place finish behind conference champions Pittsburg State University.

Ralph Miller era

Shocker basketball achieved greater success with the arrival of Coach Ralph Miller and Cleo Littleton in 1951. Littleton averaged 18.2 points per game as a freshman, a school record that still stands today. He was the first player west of the Mississippi to score 2,000 points in his college career and is one of only five Wichita State players to have his number retired. He was also one of the first African American players in the Missouri Valley Conference, which it joined in 1945. Littleton averaged 19 points per game during his career and he still owns 7 school records. Due to this success, Wichita State decided to construct a new home for the Shockers. Through appropriated money by the WU Board of Regents, Wichita State was able to construct a new field house for the men's basketball team, costing $1.4 million. On December 3, 1955, the Shockers played their first game in WU Field House in front of more than 9,000 fans.

Dave Stallworth entered the program in the 1961–62 season. Nicknamed "The Rave", Stallworth became the Shockers' first consensus All-American in 1964. He finished with a career scoring average of 24.2 points per game and was second on the all-time scoring list with 1,936 points. During his 13-year stint at WSU, Ralph Miller became the winningest coach in Shocker basketball history, collecting 255 victories. Miller is a member of the Naismith Memorial Basketball Hall of Fame and currently ranks as the eighth-winningest coach in college basketball history.

Gary Thompson era
The 1964–65 season—the first after Wichita joined the state university system as Wichita State University—was the greatest in Shocker history until the 2013–14 season. On December 14, 1964, Gary Thompson led Wichita State to its first-ever No. 1 ranking. The 19–7 Shockers won the MVC and earned a berth into the Midwest Regional. After defeating Southern Methodist and an Oklahoma State team led by Henry Iba, the Shockers headed to the Final Four in Portland. There, the Shockers were matched against the defending national champion UCLA Bruins, losing 108–89. The Shockers played a third-place game against Princeton, losing 118–82.

During this period, Warren Armstrong played for the Shockers and made major contributions throughout his career. During his sophomore season, Armstrong set two school records, averaging almost 12 rebounds a game while setting a Shocker single-game assist mark with 12. Armstrong became a three-time all-Valley performer from 1966–1968, and still holds four of WSU's 10 triple double games (double-figure points, rebounds, assist, or blocks). He would later enjoy a productive career in the ABA. Terry Benton became a key contributor during this era as well, setting a WSU record of 16.8 rebounds per game for his career, and finishing his Wichita State career with 1,003 points and 963 rebounds.

Harry Miller era
Wichita State went 97–90 from 1971 to 1978 under Harry Miller. They had several notable players during those years including Rich Morsden, Bob Wilson, Robert Gray, Bob Trogele, Cheese Johnson, Cal Bruton and Bob Elmore. They made it to the NCAA tournament in 1976, winning the Missouri Valley Conference and losing by one point to eventual national runner up Michigan. The following year they beat eventual NCAA Champion Marquette in Al McGuire's final home game in Milwaukee.

Gene Smithson era

In 1981, the Shockers would return to the NCAA tournament, defeating the Kansas Jayhawks 66–65 in the "Battle of New Orleans" before being defeated by LSU 96–85 in the Elite Eight. The 1980–81 team featured two future NBA players – Cliff Levingston and Antoine Carr, who would be chosen in the first 10 picks of the NBA draft. Carr, a local star from Wichita, would become WSU's third All-American in 1983, averaging 22.2 points a game during his senior season, and finishing his career with 1,911 points while shooting 55.7 percent. Levingston would average 15.7 and 18.5 points per game while leading the team in scoring his freshman and sophomore years, before declaring early for the NBA Draft.

Another future NBA player, Xavier McDaniel, would arrive the year after the Elite Eight season. McDaniel scored 2,152 points at Wichita State, second all-time behind Littleton, and set the school record with 1,359 rebounds. In 1984–85, McDaniel became the first player in NCAA Division I history to lead the nation in scoring (27.2 points per game) and rebounding (14.8 per game) in the same season.

In 1982, Wichita State would be placed under NCAA probation for the 1982–83 and 1983–84 seasons, regarding improper actions of former assistant coaches in the late 1970s.

In nine seasons, Smithson won 155 games, placing him second in school history behind Ralph Miller. Smithson was the first coach to guide WSU to consecutive 20-win seasons. During the four-year span from 1980–1984, WSU produced a 92–29 record, the best four-year span in team history at the time.

Mark Turgeon era
WSU hired Topeka, Kansas native Mark Turgeon as head coach on March 11, 2000. Turgeon guided the Shockers to a 9–19 record during his first season. In Turgeon's second year Wichita State began its resurgence with a combination of several veterans and newcomers to compile a 15–15 record in 2001–02.

Helped by an 11–3 record in Levitt Arena, WSU's overall record in the arena rose to 502–185 since it opened during the 1955–56 season. In the 2002–03 season, the Shockers would improve to 18 wins, and then to 21 wins in the 2003–04 season.

In 2004–05, Wichita State continued to improve, reaching the third game of the NIT, and taking the Shockers to back-to-back-to-back postseason trips for the first time since 1987-88-89. WSU's 2004–05 team went 22–10 overall, finished second in the Missouri Valley Conference, and were ranked in the top 30 for nine weeks.

In 2005–06, Turgeon lead WSU to its best season in over 20 years, reaching the Sweet 16 with victories over 10th seeded Seton Hall and shocking 2nd seeded Tennessee. In the Sweet 16, the Shockers would go on to lose to eventual Final Four participant George Mason.

In 2006–07, the Shockers entered the season with high expectations, and surged out to a 9–0 start, including a revenge-win over George Mason, as well as road victories over #6 LSU and #14 Syracuse. WSU rose as high as #8 in both the AP and Coaches' Polls on December 18, 2006, but the Shockers would struggle for much of the rest of the season, falling from the rankings and finishing 17–14, including only eight conference wins, for Turgeon's second worst mark as WSU head coach.

Head Coach Mark Turgeon left Wichita State on April 10, 2007, after a seven-year run and a 128–90 record, (at the time) the third winningest coach in Shocker history behind Ralph Miller and Gene Smithson. On April 14, 2007, Gregg Marshall was announced as 26th head men's basketball coach at Wichita State.

Gregg Marshall era
Gregg Marshall previously coached at Winthrop University for nine seasons. In his first season (2007–08) the team finished with a record of 11–20. In his second season they posted a 17–17 record, complete with a run to the second round of the 2009 CBI Tournament where they lost to Stanford. The following season the Shockers went 25–10, culminating with an NIT appearance. The invitation was due in large part to their strong 16–1 home record. Their only loss at home that year was in the NIT against Nevada.

In the 2010–11 season Wichita State improved once again to finish the season at 29–8, finishing second in the Missouri Valley to Missouri State. The Shockers would go on to win the NIT championship as a 4 seed, defeating two #1 seeds, first Virginia Tech 79–76, and then beating Alabama in the championship game 66–57.

In the 2011–12 season, they continued to improve under Marshall's guidance. In winning the regular season MVC title at 16–2 (26–4 overall), the Shockers reached a ranking of #14 in the coaches poll and #15 in the AP poll. After losing to Illinois State in the semi-finals of the MVC tourney in St. Louis, the Shockers were selected at large for the NCAA tournament as a 5 seed, their first NCAA Tournament in 6 years.  They fell to VCU 62–59, ending the season with a 27–6 record.

Heading into the 2012–2013 season, despite being the reigning regular-season champions, the Shockers were predicted to finish fourth in the Missouri Valley Conference. Wichita State went into the season having lost five of the top six scorers from the previous season, including Joe Ragland, Toure' Murry, Garrett Stutz, Ben Smith, and David Kyles. Despite the losses, the Shockers went on to win their first 9 games, including the Cancún Challenge, as well as 15 of their first 16, and 19 of their first 21. Wichita struggled in conference-play, however, losing three in a row in late January and early February. Nevertheless, the Shockers would eventually play rival Creighton in the final game of the season for the outright conference championship, losing in Omaha.

In the 2012–13 NCAA tournament, the Shockers upset top-seeded Gonzaga to move on to the Sweet 16 for the first time since 2006, followed by a 72–58 win over La Salle for their first Elite Eight appearance since 1981. They defeated Ohio State 70–66 for their first Final Four appearance since 1965, as well as their 30th win of the season, a then-Wichita State record. In the Final Four, Wichita State was defeated by the #1 overall seed and eventual tournament champion Louisville, 72–68 but that game was vacated by the NCAA.

The 2013–14 season proved to be historic and possibly the greatest season in Shocker history. The Shockers cracked the top 10 at #2 in the nation in both major polls, for the first time since December 2006. It was the highest that the Shockers had been ranked that late in the season in school history. On February 25, with a win over Bradley, the Shockers became just the 11th Division I team to start the season 30–0. They were also the first team to do so solely in the regular season, as the prior 10 teams reached that mark in the postseason. A week later, with a dominating 68–45 win over Missouri State, the Shockers became the first Division I team to finish the regular season 31–0. The Shockers ran the table with the 2014 Missouri Valley Conference men's basketball tournament, winning all three games by double digits. This was the first time Wichita State won the Valley Tournament since 1987. The Shockers received the #1 ranking in the Midwest Region of the 2014 NCAA Division I men's basketball tournament. Wichita State blew out their first opponent, Cal Poly to become the first team in the history of college basketball to advance to a record of 35–0 (a mark matched by Kentucky in the 2014–15 season). The Shockers season ended with an instant classic of a game with the Kentucky Wildcats on a missed 3-pointer at the buzzer. Their final record ended up being 35–1.

After the 2019–20 season, eight Shockers players entered the NCAA transfer portal, with seven eventually leaving the program. During this period, several former players alleged a pattern of physical and verbal abuse of players, leading to the university hiring a St. Louis-based law firm to conduct an independent investigation. Marshall resigned shortly before the 2020–21 season, with Wichita State buying out his contract for $7.75 million over six years. Assistant coach Isaac Brown was named interim head coach for 2020–21.

Rivalries
When Wichita State became a AP Top 25 regular in the early 2010s, there came interest in reviving annual games against Kansas and Kansas State. In February 2013, Kansas state senator Michael O'Donnell introduced a bill requiring Kansas and Kansas State to schedule Wichita State, but the bill never passed. Wichita State last played Kansas in the 2015 NCAA tournament, a game they won 78–65. Kansas leads the all-time series 13–3. They last played Kansas State in the 2021–22 season, a game which they lost 59–65. Kansas State leads the all-time series 19–9.

Missouri State
Wichita State had an in-conference rivalry with Missouri State dating back to the 1941–42 season (when Missouri State University was Southwest Missouri State Teacher's College). As of the 2016–17 season, following a 15-game winning streak in the series, Wichita State leads the series 39–30.

Tulsa

Wichita State's rivalry with Tulsa dates back to the 1930–31 season. The two schools were in the Missouri Valley Conference from 1945 to 1996. Beginning in the 1996–97 season, this series continued as an out-of-conference rivalry and has been most recently continuously played since the 2010–11 season, after being played in the 1996–97, 1997–98, and 2000–01 to 2004–05 seasons. As of the end of the 2020–21 season, Wichita State leads the series 72–62 following 15 games since the series resumed in 2010. Tulsa ended WSU's 5-game winning streak with a buzzer-beating 3-point win in Tulsa in February 2020, but WSU has won three since then, two at home and one on the road, including a tight 4-point game.

Creighton
Wichita State had an intense rivalry with the Creighton Bluejays during their time together in the Missouri Valley. Both squads were known as the cream of the crop in the MVC and went back and forth every year, trading the title of best team in the league. In all, the teams have played a total of 100 games against each other, with Creighton leading the overall series 55–45.

Facilities
The Shockers have played their home games at Charles Koch Arena, a 10,506 seat on-campus arena, since 1953. Originally known as the University of Wichita Field House, it was officially renamed Levitt Arena in 1969 for Henry Levitt, owner of Henry's, who sponsored a Wichita basketball team (known as the Henry Clothiers) that won three consecutive national Amateur Athletic Union titles in the 1930s. Due to its circular design, which gave nearly every fan a clear sight line and put the seats very close to the action, it was quickly nicknamed "The Roundhouse." Following a $6 million endowment from Charles G. Koch the arena underwent a $25 million renovation in 2002–03, popularly known as the "Roundhouse Renaissance." The old arena concourse was completely demolished and a new one built around the original playing/seating area. A portion of the seating bowl was remodeled to make for more legroom. All new seating was installed as well as a video scoreboard, and virtually every surface that was not renovated was given a fresh coat of paint. The Shocker basketball teams played at the Kansas Coliseum for the 2002–03 season while the arena was rebuilt. In 2012, the Shockers averaged 10,391 fans per game, ranking 38th nationally. In January 2013, ESPN's Jason King listed Koch Arena as the 7th best home court advantage in college basketball.

In addition to Koch Arena, the Shockers have played one game for each of the last eleven seasons (except 2020–21) across town at the Intrust Bank Arena, the second largest indoor arena in the state of Kansas at 15,004 seats. Wichita State is currently 8–3 (as of the 2020–21 season) when playing at Intrust.

Coaches
The Shockers are currently coached by Isaac Brown, who replaced Gregg Marshall on an interim basis after the latter resigned under pressure shortly before the 2020–21 season, but was promoted to permanent head coach during the season. Marshall in turn had replaced Maryland coach Mark Turgeon before the 2007–08 season. Under Marshall, the Shockers had one College Basketball Invitational appearance, two back-to-back NIT appearances (2010 and 2011), including an NIT championship in 2011, and six consecutive NCAA Division I men's basketball tournament appearances in 2012 through 2017. Under Marshall, the Shockers returned to the Final Four in 2013 for the first time since 1965, as champions of the West Regional. Marshall is currently tied for first place for all-time wins as a Wichita State coach with 220, as well as owning the third-highest winning percentage in WSU history, and the highest since 1933. While this may not be a big deal to Coach Marshall, he did note that the only non athlete honored in the rafters of Koch Arena is Coach Ralph Miller, with whom he is now tied.

Current coaching staff

Coaching history

Notable players

Retired numbers

Players in the NBA

Players in international basketball
 Joe Ragland (born 1989), American-Liberian basketball player for Hapoel Holon of the Israeli Basketball Premier League

Olympians
The following Shockers represented their country in the Olympics. Both participants represented the United States.

Notable in other fields

 Paul Wight, actor and wrestler under the ring name The Big Show

Individual season records

 Statistics prior to 2013–14 season courtesy of Wichita State University Men's Basketball Fact Book. 2013–14 statistics courtesy of Wichita State Sports Information.

Points

Field goal percentage

Three-point field goals

Three-point percentage

Free throws made

Free throw percentage

Rebounds

Assists

Steals

Blocked shots

Individual game records
 Statistics courtesy of Wichita State University Men's Basketball Fact Book.

Points

Rebounds

Career records
 Statistics courtesy of Wichita State University Men's Basketball Fact Book.

Games played

Games started

Points

Rebounds

Field goal percentage

Three-point field goals

Free throw percentage

Assists

Blocked shots

Steals

Postseason history

NCAA tournament results
The Shockers have appeared in 16 NCAA Tournaments. Their combined record is 18–17. 

*Following the introduction of the "First Four" round in 2011, the Round of 64 and Round of 32 were referred to as the second round and third round, respectively, from 2011 to 2015. Then from 2016 moving forward, the Round 64 and Round of 32 will be called the First and Second rounds, as they were prior to 2011.

NIT results
The Shockers have appeared in 13 National Invitation Tournaments. Their combined record is 11–12. They were NIT champions in 2011.

CBI results
The Shockers have appeared in one College Basketball Invitational. Their combined record is 1–1.

References

External links